Annette Hug (born July 10, 1970 in Zurich) is a Swiss writer.

Life 

Annette Hug grew up in Stallikon near Zurich and graduated from the Cantonal School Wiedikon in Zurich. Hug studied for a bachelor's degree in history at the University of Zurich and a master's in women and development studies at the University of the Philippines Diliman in Metro Manila. She has worked as a lecturer and union secretary of the VPOD. Hug lived in the Philippines for a long time and was active in the local women's movement. Today she lives and works as a freelance author in Zurich and is a board member of the Association of Swiss Authors.

She has been married to Stefan Keller since 2010.

Work 
 Lady Berta. Rotpunktverlag. 2008. 
 In Zelenys Zimmer. Rotpunktverlag. 2010. 
 Wilhelm Tell in Manila. Das Wunderhorn. 2016. 
 Tiefenlager. Roman. Das Wunderhorn. 2021.

Awards 
 2017: Schweizer Literaturpreis for Wilhelm Tell in Manila
 2022: ZKB-Schillerpreis for Tiefenlager

References 

University of Zurich alumni
University of the Philippines Diliman alumni
1970 births
People from Zürich
Living people